These are the Official Charts Company UK Official Indie Chart number one hits of 2001.

See also
2001 in music

References

United Kingdom Indie Singles
Indie 2001
UK Indie Chart number-one singles